Primnoeides is a genus of Cnidaria in the family Primnoidae.

Species
Primnoeides brochi Zapata-Guardiola & López-González, 2010
Primnoeides flagellum Taylor & Rogers, 2017
Primnoeides kuekenthali (Zapata-Guardiola & López-González, 2010)
Primnoeides sertularoides Wright & Studer, 1889

References

Primnoidae
Octocorallia genera